The Czech Space Office, CSO is the central contact point for the coordination of pure space science related activities in the Czech Republic. It fulfils tasks of the national information and advisory centre for the academia on opportunities to enter the international space scene and on space activities in the Czech Republic. It is a non-profit association created in November 2003. The bodies of the association are the management board, the supervisory board and the managing director.

Activities and services

 supporting the participation of Czech researchers in international space collaborations
 providing information and consulting Czech academia concerned in space-related project specification, establishing contacts with cooperation partners and support in technology transfer activities
 membership at IAF, ESTP and EURISY organisations
 student and outreach activities

To reach those objectives, the CSO organises seminars and workshops for professionals from various fields of space activities, as well as educational and public events devoted to space related topics.

The Office closely cooperates with the Czech Ministry of Education, Youth and Sport.  CSO is as well a member of the European organization EURISY promoting education and information about space technology and its applications, and a national point of contact for the World Space Week – a worldwide UN space outreach activity.

The CSO's work includes gathering and archiving information about Czech space projects as well as the information on foreign space programmes having importance for development of the Czech space activities. It covers management of databases of the Czech institutions both academia and industrial.

Moreover, the Czech Space Office also offers information on the Czech space activities and advertises their results inside and outside the country. It arranges seminars and conferences and supports the attendance of Czech institutions in specialized exhibitions dealing with space technologies.

Last but not least, CSO serves as information point for general public and academia. It prepares information and advertisement materials describing capacities and potentials of the Czech Republic academia in space, documents about their space activities and their results. It also communicates examples and information on benefits of the space projects to schools and media.

Finally, Czech space office should not be confused with a Czech space agency. Such agency does not yet exist, though it is envisaged in the National Space Plan. Until its establishment, the coordination of Czech space activities and the representation of the Czech Republic in ESA and EU space bodies is being coordinated by the Ministry of Transport. See the official space pages of the Ministry of Transport, which also include the government approved National Space Plan document in English.

External links
Czech Space Office

Science and technology in the Czech Republic
Scientific organizations based in the Czech Republic
2003 establishments in the Czech Republic
Organizations established in 2003
Government agencies established in 2003
Government agencies of the Czech Republic
Space agencies
Space program of the Czech Republic